In mathematics and computer science, the floor function is the function  that takes as input a real number , and gives as output the greatest integer less than or equal to , denoted  or .

The operation of truncation generalizes this to a specified number of digits: truncation to zero significant digits is the same as the integer part.

For  an integer, .

Notation
The integral part or integer part of a number ( in the original) was first defined in 1798 by Adrien-Marie Legendre in his proof of the Legendre's formula.

Carl Friedrich Gauss introduced the square bracket notation  in his third proof of quadratic reciprocity (1808). (Iverson used square brackets for a different purpose, the Iverson bracket notation.) Both notations are now used in mathematics, although Iverson's notation will be followed in this article.

Sometimes  is taken to mean the round-toward-zero function.

For all x,
.

These characters are provided in Unicode: 

 
 
 
 

Definition and properties
Given real numbers x and y, integers k, m, n and the set of integers , floor and ceiling may be defined by the equations

Since there is exactly one integer in a half-open interval of length one, for any real number x, there are unique integers m and n satisfying the equation

where  and  may also be taken as the definition of floor and ceiling.

Equivalences
These formulas can be used to simplify expressions involving floors and ceilings.

In the language of order theory, the floor function is a residuated mapping, that is, part of a Galois connection: it is the upper adjoint of the function that embeds the integers into the reals.

These formulas show how adding integers to the arguments affects the functions:

Monotonicity 
Both floor and ceiling functions are the monotonically non-decreasing function:

Relations among the functions
It is clear from the definitions that
   with equality if and only if x is an integer, i.e.

In fact, for integers n, both floor and ceiling functions are the identity:

Negating the argument switches floor and ceiling and changes the sign:

and:

Negating the argument complements the fractional part:

The floor, ceiling, and fractional part functions are idempotent:

The result of nested floor or ceiling functions is the innermost function:

due to the identity property for integers.

Quotients
If m and n are integers and n ≠  0,

If n is a positive integer

If m is positive

For m = 2 these imply

More generally, for positive m (See Hermite's identity)

The following can be used to convert floors to ceilings and vice versa (m positive)

For all m and n strictly positive integers:

which, for positive and coprime  m and n, reduces to

and similarly for the ceiling and fractional part functions (still for positive and coprime  m and n),

Since the right-hand side of the general case is symmetrical in m and n, this implies that

More generally, if m and n are positive,

This is sometimes called a reciprocity law.

Nested divisions
For positive integer n, and arbitrary real numbers m,x:

Continuity and series expansions

  is upper semi-continuous and    and   are lower semi-continuous.

Since none of the functions discussed in this article are continuous, none of them have a power series expansion. Since floor and ceiling are not periodic, they do not have uniformly convergent Fourier series expansions.  The fractional part function has Fourier series expansion

for  not an integer.

At points of discontinuity, a Fourier series converges to a value that is the average of its limits on the left and the right, unlike the floor, ceiling and fractional part functions: for y fixed and x a multiple of y the Fourier series given converges to y/2, rather than to x mod y = 0. At points of continuity the series converges to the true value.

Using the formula floor(x) = x − {x} gives

 
for  not an integer.

Applications

Mod operator

For an integer x and a positive integer y, the modulo operation, denoted by x mod y, gives the value of the remainder when x is divided by y.  This definition can be extended to real x and y, y ≠  0, by the formula

Then it follows from the definition of floor function that this extended operation satisfies many natural properties.  Notably, x mod y is always between 0 and y, i.e.,

if y is positive,

and if y is negative,

Quadratic reciprocity
Gauss's third proof of quadratic reciprocity, as modified by Eisenstein, has two basic steps.

Let p and q be distinct positive odd prime numbers, and let
  

First, Gauss's lemma is used to show that the Legendre symbols are given by

and

The second step is to use a geometric argument to show that

Combining these formulas gives quadratic reciprocity in the form

There are formulas that use floor to express the quadratic character of small numbers mod odd primes p:

Rounding

Number of digits
The number of digits in base b of a positive integer k is

Number of strings without repeated characters
The number of possible strings of arbitrary length that don't use any character twice is given by 

where:

  > 0 is the number of letters in the alphabet (e.g., 26 in English)
 the falling factorial  denotes the number of strings of length  that don't use any character twice.
 ! denotes the factorial of 
  = 2.718… is Euler's number

For  = 26, this comes out to 1096259850353149530222034277.

Factors of factorials
Let n be a positive integer and p a positive prime number. The exponent of the highest power of p that divides n! is given by a version of Legendre's formula

where  is the way of writing n in base p. This is a finite sum, since the floors are zero when pk > n.

Beatty sequence
The Beatty sequence shows how every positive irrational number gives rise to a partition of the natural numbers into two sequences via the floor function.

Euler's constant (γ)
There are formulas for Euler's constant γ = 0.57721 56649 ... that involve the floor and ceiling, e.g.

and

Riemann zeta function (ζ)
The fractional part function also shows up in integral representations of the Riemann zeta function. It is straightforward to prove (using integration by parts) that if  is any function with a continuous derivative in the closed interval [a, b],

Letting  for real part of s greater than 1 and letting a and b be integers, and letting b approach infinity gives

This formula is valid for all s with real part greater than −1, (except s = 1, where there is a pole) and combined with the Fourier expansion for {x} can be used to extend the zeta function to the entire complex plane and to prove its functional equation.

For s = σ + it in the critical strip 0 < σ < 1,

In 1947 van der Pol used this representation to construct an analogue computer for finding roots of the zeta function.

Formulas for prime numbers
The floor function appears in several formulas characterizing prime numbers.  For example, since  is equal to 1 if m divides n, and to 0 otherwise, it follows that a positive integer n is a prime if and only if

One may also give formulas for producing the prime numbers.  For example, let pn be the n-th prime, and for any integer r > 1, define the real number α by the sum

Then

A similar result is that there is a number θ = 1.3064... (Mills' constant) with the property that

are all prime.

There is also a number ω = 1.9287800... with the property that

are all prime.

Let (x) be the number of primes less than or equal to x. It is a straightforward deduction from Wilson's theorem that

Also, if n ≥ 2,

None of the formulas in this section are of any practical use.

Solved problems
Ramanujan submitted these problems to the Journal of the Indian Mathematical Society.

If n is a positive integer, prove that
 

 

 Some generalizations to the above floor function identities have been proven.

Unsolved problem
The study of Waring's problem has led to an unsolved problem:

Are there any positive integers k ≥ 6 such that

 ?

Mahler has proved there can only be a finite number of such k; none are known.

Computer implementations

In most programming languages, the simplest method to convert a floating point number to an integer does not do floor or ceiling, but truncation. The reason for this is historical, as the first machines used ones' complement and truncation was simpler to implement (floor is simpler in two's complement). FORTRAN was defined to require this behavior and thus almost all processors implement conversion this way. Some consider this to be an unfortunate historical design decision that has led to bugs handling negative offsets and graphics on the negative side of the origin.

Division by a power of 2 is often written as a right-shift, not for optimization as might be assumed, but because the floor of negative results is required. Assuming such shifts are "premature optimization" and replacing them with division can break software.

Many programming languages (including C, C++, C#,  Java, PHP, R, and Python) provide standard functions for floor and ceiling, usually called floor and ceil, or less commonly ceiling. The language APL uses ⌊x for floor.  The J Programming Language, a follow-on to APL that is designed to use standard keyboard symbols, uses <. for floor and >. for ceiling.
ALGOL usesentier for floor.

In Microsoft Excel the floor function is implemented as INT (which rounds down rather than toward zero). The command FLOOR in earlier versions would round toward zero, effectively the opposite of what "int" and "floor" do in other languages. Since 2010 FLOOR has been fixed to round down, with extra arguments that can reproduce previous behavior. The OpenDocument file format, as used by OpenOffice.org, Libreoffice and others, uses the same function names; INT does floor and FLOOR has a third argument that can make it round toward zero.

See also
 Bracket (mathematics)
 Integer-valued function
 Step function
 Modulo operation

Citations

References

Nicholas J. Higham, Handbook of writing for the mathematical sciences, SIAM. , p. 25
ISO/IEC. ISO/IEC 9899::1999(E): Programming languages — C (2nd ed), 1999; Section 6.3.1.4, p. 43.

Michael Sullivan. Precalculus, 8th edition, p. 86

External links

 
 Štefan Porubský, "Integer rounding functions", Interactive Information Portal for Algorithmic Mathematics, Institute of Computer Science of the Czech Academy of Sciences, Prague, Czech Republic, retrieved 24 October 2008
 
 

Special functions
Mathematical notation
Unary operations